Maria Cristina Vettore Austin (June 24, 1929 – December 25, 2008) was an Italian socialite who became better known as Cristina Ford or Mrs. Henry Ford II, due to her marriage to Henry Ford II, the chief executive officer of the Ford Motor Company.

Biography
Maria was born on June 24, 1929 in Grancona near Vicenza, Italy, and educated in Milan. Her father was Edoardo Vettore of Milan, who died when she was a child.  Her mother was Lavina Ferron.

First marriage
Cristina first married Robin Willoughby Merivale Austin (married on 20 August 1946), a Canadian from Montreal serving in the British Royal Navy. They divorced in Quebec, Canada in 1955.

Second marriage
Cristina met Henry Ford II in 1960 during a party at Maxim's in Paris, France. She became Ford's second wife on February 19, 1965. While married to Henry Ford II, she was described by LIFE magazine as a "highly effective ambassadress for the Ford Motor Company". In 1969, the Women's Wear Daily called her "the complete Italian". In 1973, Cristina Ford was listed on the International Hall of Fame of the International Best Dressed List. In 1976, after eleven years of marriage, 56-year-old Henry Ford II and 45-year-old Cristina Ford ended the marriage, with Cristina receiving US$16 million. In 1988, Cristina Ford filed a suit against Henry Ford II's estate seeking an expanded alimony claim worth an additional US$5 million.

Friendships
She was a friend of former Philippine First Lady Imelda Marcos, the wife of former Philippine President Ferdinand Marcos. In an interview with Walter Hayes, UK public relations executive for Ford, he related how Henry accused the two women of being lovers, a charge which Cristina indignantly denied. The two women, as documented in a Filipino newsreel of Imelda Marcos' official visit to Iran to represent President Marcos at the 2500th Persian monarchy celebrations in October 1971, shared her assigned royal encampment tent (for which Mrs Marcos received personal permission from Queen Farah Pahlavi to do so) so that Mrs Ford could stay with her during the event rather than at a hotel in the city of Shiraz.

Death 
Cristina Ford died in Rome on Christmas Day 2008.

See also
Henry Ford II

References

Italian socialites
American people of Italian descent
1926 births
2008 deaths